Knotek (feminine Knotková) is a Czech surname. It may refer to:
 Ivan Knotek, Slovak politician
 Jaroslav Knotek, Czech athlete
 Kyle Knotek, American soccer player
 Michelle Knotek, American murderer
 Ondřej Knotek, Czech politician
 Tomáš Knotek, Czech ice hockey player

Czech-language surnames